Evans Butte is a prominent snow-topped butte,  high, standing at the head of Albanus Glacier and marking the southeast limit of the Tapley Mountains of Antarctica. It was named by the Advisory Committee on Antarctic Names for Lieutenant Eldon L. Evans, U.S. Navy medical officer of the Byrd Station winter party, 1962.

References 

Buttes of Antarctica
Landforms of Marie Byrd Land